This is a list of Russian military aircraft in service in three branches of the Russian Armed Forces and in the National Guard of Russia. It also includes lists of Russia's experimental aircraft and aircraft in development.

Russian Air Force

|-
! colspan="8" | Multirole/Fighter aircraft
|-
| Mikoyan MiG-29 || USSR/Russia || Jet || Fighter || 1982 || 87|| 87|| 70 MiG-29/MiG-29UB, 15 MiG-29SMT and 2 MiG-29UBT in service.
|-
| Mikoyan MiG-31 || USSR || Jet || Interceptor || 1981 || 85 || 85 || 85 MiG-31BM in service.
|-
| Mikoyan MiG-35 || Russia || Jet || Multirole || 2019 || 6 || 6 || 6 MiG-35S/UB.
|-
| Sukhoi Su-27 || USSR/Russia || Jet || Fighter aircraft|Fighter || 1985 || 101 || 101 || 12 Su-27, 18 Su-27UB, 47 Su-27SM and 24 Su-27SM3 in service.
|-
| Sukhoi Su-30 || Russia || Jet || Multirole || 2012 || 110 || 110 || 91 Su-30SM and 19 Su-30M2 in service.
|-
| Sukhoi Su-34 || Russia || Jet || Multirole || 2006 || 147 || 147 || 132 Su-34 and at least 15 Su-34M. A total of 40 Su-34M on order.
|-
| Sukhoi Su-35 || Russia || Jet || Multirole || 2013 || 110 || 110 || 110 Su-35S in service. A total of 30 on order.
|-
| Sukhoi Su-57 || Russia || Jet || Multirole || 2020 || 10 || 10 || A total of 76 on order. As of December 2022, 10 have been delivered to the 929th State Flight Test Centre at Akhtubinsk and other bases. https://bmpd.livejournal.com/4635723.html
|-
! colspan="8" | Attack aircraft
|-
| Sukhoi Su-24 || USSR || Jet || Attack || 1975 || 273 || 273 || 
|-
| Sukhoi Su-25 || USSR || Jet || Attack || 1981 || 192 || 192 || 
|-
! colspan="8" | Transport aircraft
|-
| Antonov An-12 || USSR || Propeller || Transport/Patrol || 1959 || 59 || 104 || 
|-
| Antonov An-22 || USSR || Propeller || Transport  || 1969 || 3 || 11 || 
|-
| Antonov An-26 || USSR || Propeller || Transport/Patrol  || 1970 || 116 || 190 || 
|-
| Antonov An-72 || USSR || Jet || Transport || 1977 || 31 || 39 || 
|-
| Antonov An-124 || USSR || Jet || Transport  || 1986 || 4 || 26 || 1 on order
|-
| Antonov An-140 || Ukraine/Russia || Propeller || Transport || 2002 || 4 || 5 || 
|-
| Antonov An-148 || Ukraine/Russia || Jet || Transport || 2009 || 15 || 15 || 
|-
| Ilyushin Il-18 || USSR || Propeller || Transport || 1958 || 3 || 3 || 
|-
| Ilyushin Il-62 || USSR/Russia || Jet || Transport || 1967 || 8 || 11 || 
|-
| Ilyushin Il-76 || USSR/Russia || Jet || Transport || 1974 || 120 || 120 || 20 on order
|-
| Tupolev Tu-134 || USSR || Jet || Transport/Trainer/Patrol || 1967 || 43 || 147 || 
|-
| Tupolev Tu-154 || USSR || Jet || Transport || 1970 || 3 || 20 || 
|-
| Let L-410 Turbolet || Czechoslovakia || Propeller || Transport/Trainer || 1970 || 53 || 107 || 2 on order
|-
! colspan="8" | Trainer aircraft
|-
| Diamond DA42 || Austria || Propeller || Trainer || 2017 || 35 || 35 || 35 DA42T in service
|-
| Aero L-39 Albatros || Czechoslovakia || Jet || Trainer || 1974 || 118 || 181 ||
|-
| Yakovlev Yak-130 || Russia || Jet || Trainer || 2009 || 109+ || 109+ || 109+ combat capable Yak-130 in service. 25 on order.
|-
! colspan="8" | Bombers
|-
| Tupolev Tu-22M || USSR || Jet || Bomber || 1973 || 66 || 66 || 
|-
| Tupolev Tu-95 || USSR || Turboprop || Bomber || 1956 || 42 || 42 || 
|-
| Tupolev Tu-160 || USSR/Russia || Jet || Bomber || 1987 || 15 || 15 || 10 on order
|-
! colspan="8" | Special aircraft
|-
| Antonov An-30 || USSR || Propeller || Patrol || 1970 || 15 || 15 || 
|-
| Beriev A-50 || USSR || Jet || Command and control || 1984 || 15 || 15 || 
|-
| Ilyushin Il-20/22 || USSR || Propeller || Patrol/Command and control || 1969/1971 || 25 || 25 || 
|-
| Ilyushin Il-78 || USSR || Jet || Tanker || 1984 || 20 || 20 || 10 on order
|-
| Ilyushin Il-80 || USSR || Jet || Command and control || 1992 || 3 || 3 || 
|-
| Tupolev Tu-214 || Russia || Jet || Command and control/ Reconnaissance || 2013 || 6 || 6 || 2 x Tu-214R  2 x Tu-214ON  2 x Tu-214PU-SBUS
|-
! colspan="8" | UCAV
|-
| Sokol Altius || Russia || Propeller || Attack/Reconnaissance || 2021 || 3 || 3 || 
|-
! colspan="8" | Helicopter
|-
| Kamov Ka-27 || USSR || Rotorcraft || Attack || 1982 || 6 || 6 || 
|-
| Kamov Ka-52 || Russia || Rotorcraft || Attack || 2011 || 116 || 116 || 40 on order
|-
| Kamov Ka-226 || Russia || Rotorcraft || Utility  || 2003 || 36 || 36 || 
|-
| Kazan Ansat || Russia || Rotorcraft || Utility  || 2013 || 50 || 50 || 
|-
| Mil Mi-2 || Polish People's Republic || Rotorcraft || Transport || 1965 || 43 || 43 || 
|-
| Mil Mi-8/Mi-17 || USSR/Russia || Rotorcraft || Transport/Utility || 1967 || 788 || 788 || 10 on order
|-
| Mil Mi-24/35 || USSR/Russia || Rotorcraft || Attack || 1972 || 328 || 328 || 
|-
| Mil Mi-26 || USSR/Russia || Rotorcraft || Transport || 1985 || 44 || 44 || 
|-
| Mil Mi-28 || Russia || Rotorcraft || Attack || 2006 || 112 || 112 || 105 on order
|-
| Mil Mi-38 || Russia || Rotorcraft || Transport || 2019 || 2 || 2 || 2 on order
|-
| Eurocopter AS350/AS355 || France || Rotorcraft || Utility || 2006 || 5 || 5 || 
|}

Russian Naval Aviation

|-
! colspan="8" | Multirole/Fighter aircraft
|-
| Sukhoi Su-27 || USSR/Russia || Jet || Fighter || 1985 || 18 || 18 || 18 Su-27/Su-27UB in service
|-
| Sukhoi Su-30 || Russia || Jet || Multirole || 2012 || 30 || 30 || 22 Su-30SM in service. A total of 21 Su-30SM2 on order, 8 of which have entered service as of November 2022.
|-
| Sukhoi Su-33 || Russia || Jet || Fighter Carrier-based || 1998 || 18 || 18 || 
|-
| Mikoyan MiG-29K || Russia || Jet || Multirole Carrier-based || 2010 || 22 || 22 ||  19 MiG-29KR and 3 MiG-29KUBR in service.
|-
| Mikoyan MiG-31 || USSR || Jet || Interceptor || 1981 || 32 || 32 || 10 MiG-31B/BS and 22 MiG-31BM in service.
|-
! colspan="8" | Attack aircraft
|-
| Sukhoi Su-24 || USSR || Jet || Attack || 1975 || 22 || 22 || 
|-
| Sukhoi Su-25UTG || USSR || Jet || Attack/Trainer Carrier-based || 1988 || 4 || 4 || 
|-
! colspan="8" | Transport aircraft
|-
| Antonov An-24 || USSR || Propeller || Transport || 1962 || 1 || 3 || 
|-
| Antonov An-26 || USSR || Propeller || Transport || 1970 || 26 || 44 || 
|-
| Antonov An-72 || USSR || Jet || Transport || 1977 || 5 || 5 || 
|-
| Antonov An-140 || Ukraine/Russia || Propeller || Transport || 2002 || 4 || 4 || 
|-
| Ilyushin Il-18D || USSR || Propeller || Transport || 1958 || 1 || 1 || 
|-
| Tupolev Tu-134 || USSR || Jet || Transport || 1967 || 6 || 11 || 
|-
| Tupolev Tu-154 || USSR || Jet || Transport || 1970 || 1 || 1 || 
|-
! colspan="8" | Trainer aircraft
|-
| Aero L-39 Albatros || Czechoslovakia || Jet || Trainer || 1974 || 1 || 1 || 
|-
| Yakovlev Yak-130 || Russia || Jet || Trainer || 2009 || 0 || 0 || 5 on order
|-
! colspan="8" | Special aircraft
|-
| Antonov An-12 || USSR || Propeller || Patrol || 1959 || 5 || 5 || 
|-
| Beriev Be-12 || USSR || Propeller || Patrol || 1961 || 6 || 6 || 
|-
| Beriev Be-200 || Russia || Jet || Patrol || 2004 || 1 || 2 || 
|-
| Ilyushin Il-20 || USSR || Propeller || Command and control || 1969 || 2 || 2 || 
|-
| Ilyushin Il-22 || USSR || Propeller || Command and control || 1971 || 2 || 2 || 
|-
| Ilyushin Il-38 || USSR || Propeller || ASW/Patrol || 1967 || 21 || 21 || 
|-
| Tupolev Tu-142 || USSR || Propeller || ASW/Patrol || 1972 || 24 || 24 || 
|-
! colspan="8" | Helicopter
|-
| Ka-27 || USSR || Rotorcraft || ASW/Patrol || 1982 || 90 || 90 || 
|-
| Ka-28 || USSR || Rotorcraft || ASW/Patrol || 1982 || 2 || 2 || 
|-
| Ka-29 || USSR || Rotorcraft || ASW/Patrol || 1982 || 10 || 10 || 
|-
| Kamov Ka-31 || Russia || Rotorcraft || AWAC || 1995 || 3 || 3 || 
|-
| Kamov Ka-52K || Russia || Rotorcraft || Attack || 2015 || 3 || 3 || 
|-
| Mil Mi-8 || USSR || Rotorcraft || Transport || 1967 || 11 || 27 || 
|-
| Mi-24/35 || USSR/Russia || Rotorcraft || Attack || 1972 || 2 || 2 || 
|}

Russian National Guard

Russian Ground Forces

|-
! colspan="8" | UAV/UCAV
|-
| Arash 2 || Iran || Jet || Loitering munition || 2022 ||  ||  || 
|-
| Eleron || Russia || Propeller || Reconnaissance || 2003 ||  ||  || 
|-
| Eleron-3SV || Russia || Propeller || Reconnaissance || 2012 ||  ||  || 
|-
| Eleron-10 || Russia || Propeller || Reconnaissance || 2011 ||  ||  ||
|-
| IAI Searcher 2 / Forpost || Israel / Russia || Propeller || Attack/Reconnaissance || 2010 || 34 ||  || 
|-
| Geran-1 || Iran || Propeller || Loitering munition || 2022 || || || 
|- 
| Geran-2 || Iran || Propeller || Loitering munition || 2022 || || || 
|-
| Kronshtadt Orion || Russia || Propeller || Attack/Reconnaissance || 2019 || About 100 || About 100 || 
|-
| Granat || Russia || Propeller || Reconnaissance ||  ||  ||  || 
|-
| Granat-2 || Russia || Propeller || Reconnaissance ||  ||  ||  || 
|-
| Granat-4 || Russia || Propeller || Reconnaissance ||  ||  ||  || 
|-
| Grusha || Russia || Propeller || Reconnaissance ||  ||  ||  || 
|-
| IAI Bird-Eye 400 / Zastava || Israel || Propeller || Reconnaissance || 2010 ||  ||  || 
|-
| Navodchik-2 || Russia || Propeller || Reconnaissance ||  ||  ||  || 
|-
| Orlan-10 || Russia || Propeller || Reconnaissance || 2010 || 1000 ||  || 
|-
| Orlan-30 || Russia || Propeller || Reconnaissance || 2020 || ||  ||
|-
| Shahed 129 || Iran || Jet || Attack ||  ||  ||  || 
|-
| Takhion || Russia || Propeller || Reconnaissance ||  ||  ||  || 
|-
| Tipchak || Russia || Propeller || Reconnaissance || 2008 ||  ||  || 
|-
| Tupolev Tu-243 || Russia || Jet || Reconnaissance || 1994 ||  ||  || 
|-
| Yakovlev Pchela || Russia || Propeller || Reconnaissance || 1990 || 92 ||  || 
|-
| ZALA Kub || Russia ||Propeller || Loitering munition || 2019 ||  ||  || 
|-
| ZALA Lancet || Russia || Propeller || Loitering munition || 2019 ||  ||  || 
|-
| ZALA 421-08 || Russia || Propeller || Reconnaissance || 2008 || 400 ||  || 
|-
| Qods Mohajer-6 || Iran || Propeller || ISTAR ||  ||  ||  || 
|-
! colspan="8" | Aerial target
|-
| E95M || Russia || Target drone || combat training for troops / testing of air defence ||  || || || 
|-
| DAN/Dan-M || Russia || Target drone || combat training for troops / testing of air defence ||  || || || 
|-
| KBLA-IVT || Russia || VTOL target drone || combat training for troops / testing of air defence ||  ||end of 2020 || || 
|-
| 9F6021 Adyutant || Russia || Target drone system || combat training for troops / testing of air defence ||  || || || 
|}

Developmental aircraft

|-
| Alekseyev Orlan || Russia || Jet || Ekranoplan || 2027 || || ||  
|-
| Beriev A-42 || USSR/Russia || Jet || ASW/SAR ||  ||  || 1 || To replace the Be-12
|-
| Beriev A-100 || Russia || Jet || Command and control || 2018 || 2026 || 1 || To replace the A-50
|-
| Gunship || Russia || Propeller || Close air support || || ||  || Similar to the Lockheed AC-130
|-
| Ilyushin Il-78M-90A || Russia || Jet || Tanker || 2017 || 2021 || 1 ||  10 on order
|-
| Ilyushin Il-96-400TZ || Russia || Jet || Tanker ||  ||  || 2 || Based on the Il-96-400T freighter
|-
| Ilyushin Il-112 || Russia || Propeller || Transport || 2019 || 2021 || 2 || To replace the An-26 and An-72
|-
| Ilyushin Il-276 || Russia || Jet || Transport || 2023 || 2026 ||  || To replace the  An-12
|-
| Ilyushin Il-106 PAK VTA || Russia || Jet || Transport || 2024–2026 ||  ||  || To replace the An-124 and An-22
|-
| Kamov Ka-60 || Russia || Rotorcraft || Transport/Utility ||  ||  || 2 || 
|-
| Kamov Ka-65 || Russia || Rotorcraft || ASW ||  ||  || 1 || 
|-
| Kronstadt Grom || Russia || Jet || Attack/Reconnaissance || || || || Loyal wingman
|-
| Kronstadt Orion-2 (Helios) || Russia || Propeller || Attack/Reconnaissance || 2023 ||  || || 
|-
| Kronstadt Sirius || Russia || Propeller || Attack/Reconnaissance || 2022 || 2023 || || 
|-
| Luch Korsar || Russia || Propeller || Attack/Reconnaissance || 2015 || 2018 || >3 || It includes also an upgraded variant
|-
| Mikoyan MiG-41 || Russia || Jet || Fighter || 2025 ||  ||  || To replace the MiG-31
|-
| Sokol heavy striker drone || Russia || Propeller || Attack/Reconnaissance  || ||  ||  || Similar to the General Atomics Avenger
|-
| Sukhoi Su-75 Checkmate || Russia || Jet || Multirole || || || || Single engine fifth-generation multirole fighter
|-
| Sukhoi PAK ShA || Russia || Jet || Ground attack || || || || Project for a combat aviation complex to replace the Su-25 after 2030
|-
| Sukhoi S-70 Okhotnik-B || Russia || Jet || Attack/Reconnaissance  || 2019 || 2024 || 2 || 
|-
| Tupolev PAK DA || Russia || Jet || Bomber || 2023 || 2027 || || 
|-
| Tupolev PIAK || Russia || Jet || ASW ||  ||  ||  || Based on the Tu-214 airliner
|-
| Yakovlev VTOL fighter || Russia || Jet || Carrier-based fighter ||  ||  ||  || Planned VTOL fighter for future Russian aircraft carrier program
|}

Experimental aircraft

See also
 List of active Russian Air Force aircraft
 Russian presidential aircraft 
 List of military aircraft of the Soviet Union and the CIS
 Lists of currently active military equipment by country

References

Russian
Russia
Russian and Soviet military-related lists